The telogreika or vatnik is a variety of Russian warm cotton wool-padded jacket. It was also a part of the winter uniform first issued by the Red Army during World War II. Telogreikas continued to be issued until the late 1960s.

Variations 

The earlier 1935 vatniks resembled a modern wool jacket in shape and cut. Issued extensively from 1935 to 1941, with a simplified version from 1941 onwards.

The basic cut the uniform followed was that of a quilted jacket and quilted trousers. The trousers had a button fly and were tied at the bottom of the legs. There were usually pockets on the hips of the trousers and a button pocket on the front of the trouser leg.

Telogreika jackets buttoned up the front, and the jacket sleeves buttoned closed. Early issue variants had high collars, though these were absent later on. Telogreika jackets usually had a single pocket on the front of the jacket.

The clothing was usually khaki in colour, although black uniforms were issued to tank crews and some grey variants can be seen, sewn of cotton (and later polyester-blend) fabric with a cotton wool batting inside.

The jacket and trousers usually had a ribbed design with the quilting, although this feature was absent on many of the non-Soviet issue uniforms.

Effectiveness 
When worn with valenki and an ushanka, the wearer can comfortably remain warm in sub-zero temperatures for long periods. This made it an ideal uniform for the Red Army and for the guards of the Gulag.

Issue 

The telogreika faded from military issue in the early 1960s, being largely replaced by the return of the old woollen shinel greatcoat and the bushlat pea coat. In the early 1980s, the introduction of the Afghanka field uniform marked the dawn of a new era in the Soviet Army. Today, the telogreika is still used in Russia and many former Eastern Bloc countries by private citizens. In Russia, it remains popular amongst night watchmen, construction workers and the homeless.

Sources 
 
 

Jackets
Military uniforms
Russian clothing
Russian inventions
Soviet military uniforms